Jeon Soo-kyeong (born July 12, 1966) is a South Korean actress. She is best known in musical theatre, and has starred in Korean productions of Mamma Mia!, Chicago, The Life, Guys and Dolls, Menopause, and Kiss Me, Kate.

Jeon married Eric M. Swanson, general manager of the Millennium Seoul Hilton, on September 22, 2014. She has twin daughters Joo Ji-on and Joo Si-on from her first marriage, which ended in divorce in 2008.

Theater

Filmography

Film

Television series

Web series

Variety show

Awards and nominations

References

External links

Jeon Soo-kyeong at Instagram

1966 births
Living people
South Korean musical theatre actresses
South Korean stage actresses
South Korean film actresses
South Korean television actresses
Hanyang University alumni
People from Seoul